Douentza Airport  is an airstrip serving Douentza in Mali.

See also
Transport in Mali

References

 OurAirports - Mali
  Great Circle Mapper - Douentza
 Douentza
 Google Earth

External links

Airports in Mali